The Hansa-Brandenburg W.25 was a German floatplane fighter of the World War I era, designed and built by Hansa-Brandenburg.

Design and development
The W.25 was an improved version of the KDW with a modified biplane cellule with conventional inter-plane struts. One prototype was built (s/n 2258), and the aircraft competed with the Albatros W.4, but the W.4 demonstrated a better flight performance. Therefore, Hansa-Brandenburg returned the W.25 to its factory for modification with a second pair of ailerons on the lower wing. However, the W.25 was not ordered into production because the Imperial German Navy lost interest in single-seat fighters.

Specifications (W.25)

See also

References

Bibliography

1910s German fighter aircraft
Flying boats
W.25
Single-engined tractor aircraft
Biplanes
Aircraft first flown in 1917